Yazali is a census town in Lower Subansiri district in the Indian state of Arunachal Pradesh.

See also 
 New Palin, a town in the Kurung Kumey district

Cities and towns in Lower Subansiri district